Harald Hansen (30 October 1884 – 6 March 1956) was a Norwegian gymnast. He competed in the men's team event at the 1908 Summer Olympics, winning a silver medal.

References

External links
 

1884 births
1956 deaths
Norwegian male artistic gymnasts
Olympic gymnasts of Norway
Gymnasts at the 1908 Summer Olympics
Olympic silver medalists for Norway
Olympic medalists in gymnastics
Medalists at the 1908 Summer Olympics
People from Halden
Sportspeople from Viken (county)
20th-century Norwegian people